Zoran Ferić (born 2 June 1961 in Zagreb, Croatia) is a Croatian writer and columnist who resides in Zagreb. He has attended the Ivan Goran Kovačić Elementary School in the city's wealthy neighborhood of Šalata and graduated in Croatian studies at the Faculty of Philosophy at the University of Zagreb. He has written three novels and two collections of short stories. For his literary work, he has received the Ksaver Šandor Gjalski Prize in 2000 and the Jutarnji list Award in 2001. Ferić wrote columns for Nacional, a Croatian weekly. He teaches Croatian at a higher secondary school in Zagreb.

Books
1996 – Mišolovka Walta Disneya (Walt Disney's Mousetrap) - (2003 feature film Walt Disney's Mousetrap)
1998 – Quattro stagioni (Four Seasons; in co-operation with Miroslav Kiš, Robert Mlinarec and Boris Perić)
2000 – Anđeo u ofsajdu (An Angel Offside)
2002 – Smrt djevojčice sa žigicama (Death of the Little Match Girl)
2003 – Otpusno pismo (Letter of Discharge)
2005 – Djeca Patrasa (The Children of Patras)
2007 – Simetrija čuda (The Symmetry of the Miracle)
2011 – Kalendar Maja (The Maya Calendar)
2015 – Na osami blizu mora
2019 – San ljetne noći

References

                  

1961 births
Living people
Writers from Zagreb
Croatian novelists
Male novelists
Croatian male short story writers
Croatian short story writers
Croatian male writers
Croatian columnists
Faculty of Humanities and Social Sciences, University of Zagreb alumni